Simon Rose (born 14 October 1957 in Abingdon, Oxon, growing up in Newcastle-upon-Tyne) A former BBC Radio researcher for BBC Light Entertainment programmes including Weekending, The News Quiz, News Huddlines and Not the Nine O' Clock News, Rose worked as a financial journalist for the BBC and others. He later became a film journalist reviewing for the Daily Mirror for four years.

After three years as spokesman for the pressure group Save Our Savers, he became a presenter on the national business radio station Share Radio.

He developed and shared screenwriting and executive producer credits for The Flying Scotsman, a small British film which opened the 60th International Edinburgh Film Festival 2006 and received 5 Scottish BAFTA nominations.

He has written a range of 14 books including Complete and Utter Zebu with Steve Caplin, which examines the deceptions and corruptions that the media, politicians and corporations apply to everyone's daily life and Dad Stuff, a guide for families to entertain young children.

A secular Jew with three children, he lives in Southfields and has contributed to many publications.

References

External links 
Simon Rose's work info
Complete and Utter Zebu
Fun and Games for the 21st Century

1957 births
Living people
British male screenwriters
English writers
Secular Jews
English male journalists
Writers from Newcastle upon Tyne
English Jewish writers